John Henry Alderson (5 March 1910 – 1986) was a footballer who played in the Football League for Darlington. He was born in England.

Career statistics

References

English footballers
Darlington F.C. players
Stoke City F.C. players
English Football League players
Association football outside forwards
Bishop Auckland F.C. players
1910 births
1986 deaths
People from County Durham (district)
Footballers from County Durham